James Stuart (1802 – 26 May 1842) was an Irish surgeon and medical official in New South Wales and Norfolk Island, as well as a noted illustrator of natural history.

Family
Born in Ireland in about 1802, Stuart was the son of Thomas Stuart, allegedly the illegitimate son of  Thomas Smyth, MP for Limerick City. His uncle was the Indian Army officer Charles "Hindoo" Stuart, a notable Indophile.

One of his eight brothers was the diplomat Major Robert Stuart, and Robert Stuart King, the footballer and clergyman, was his great-nephew.

Medical career
Stuart arrived in Australia in June 1834 and remained there until his death eight years later. In a letter to his sister Margaret, he recounted his journey "by the ship Jessie from Liverpool, which place we left in December 1833 and after encountering very stormy weather we were obliged to put into Falmouth. We left the latter place in February and after a fine passage we put into Talbot Bay at the beautiful Town of the Cape of Good Hope. From this we sailed to Hobart Town and thence to Sydney, nothing remarkable occurring on the passage except that we were sometimes in danger from the drunkenness and consequent incapacity of our Captain".

He served as colonial assistant surgeon in New South Wales and Norfolk Island. He took charge of the sick who arrived at Sydney on board the emigrant ship Minerva on 24 January 1838. Of the 198 steerage passengers, 86 contracted typhus, 14 of whom died during the passage.

From 1838 to 1840 Stuart was assistant surgeon on Norfolk Island, and by 1841 he was the acting medical officer in charge of the North Head Quarantine Station in Sydney.

Illustrations

Stuart was a keen natural historian and illustrated many species of mammals, birds, insects, fish and plants during his time in Australia.

Many of the drawings were bequeathed to William Sharp Macleay and later given to the Linnean Society of New South Wales. They are now held by the New South Wales state archives and the Mitchell Library.

Death and legacy
Stuart died suddenly at Lake Innes House in Port Macquarie, New South Wales, on 26 May 1842. Two earlier bouts of typhus, presumably contracted from incoming disease-ridden ships, may have hastened his death.

William Sharp Macleay named the brown antechinus (Antechinus stuartii) after him in 1841.

References

Further reading 
 Musgrave, A. (1955). Dr James Stuart: Artist Naturalist. Erskenville, NSW.
 Olsen, Penny. (2001). Feather and Brush: Three Centuries of Australian Bird Art. Melbourne, CSIRO Publishing. 240 pp (with numerous colour illustrations). 
 Pearce, Barry. (1989). Australian Artists, Australian Birds. Angus & Robertson: Sydney. 

1802 births
1842 deaths
Australian naturalists
Australian people of Irish descent
Australian bird artists
19th-century Australian painters
19th-century Australian male artists
Australian male painters